Ryan Larkin (July 31, 1943 – February 14, 2007) was a Canadian animator, artist, and sculptor who rose to fame with the psychedelic Oscar-nominated short Walking (1968) and the acclaimed Street Musique (1972). He was the subject of the Oscar-winning film Ryan.

Early life
Larkin had idolized his older brother, Ronald, whom he described as "the epitome of cool". In 1958, at the age of fifteen, Larkin witnessed his brother die in a boating accident and, because he had never learned to swim, was unable to save him. Larkin stated that his brother's death deeply scarred him.

Larkin attended the Art School of the Montreal Museum of Fine Arts where he studied under Arthur Lismer (a member of the Group of Seven) before starting to work at the National Film Board of Canada in 1962.

NFB years
At the National Film Board of Canada (NFB), Larkin learned animation techniques from the ground-breaking and award-winning animator Norman McLaren. He made two acclaimed short animated films, Syrinx (1965) and Cityscape (1966), before going on to create Walking (1969). Walking was nominated for an Academy Award in 1970 in the category Best Short Subject, Cartoon, but lost to It's Tough to Be a Bird by director Ward Kimball. Syrinx won many international awards. He went on to direct the award-winning short Street Musique, which premiered in 1972 and would be the last of his works, finished during his lifetime.

He also contributed art work and animation effects to NFB films including the 1974 feature Running Time, directed by Mort Ransen, in which Larkin also played three bit parts.

In 1975, the NFB commissioned Larkin to create a mural for the entrance foyer at its Montreal headquarters. Larkin, who was bi-sexual, delivered a piece featuring an adolescent boy with an erection, which the NFB removed from viewing.

Larkin left the NFB in 1982.

Ryan, the film (2004)
In later years, Larkin was plagued by a downward spiral of drug abuse, alcoholism and homelessness. By this time, estranged from his parents, he had developed a routine of spending his nights at Montreal's Old Brewery Mission, and his days panhandling at Schwartz's Deli, eating at Mondo Fritz, drinking beer at the Copacabana bar, or reading a book in the lounge at Welch's used book store. In 2004, he was back in the limelight when a 14-minute computer-animated documentary on his life, Ryan, by Canadian animator Chris Landreth, won the Academy Award for Animated Short Film and screened to acclaim at film festivals throughout the world. Alter Egos (2004), directed by Laurence Green, is a documentary about the making of Ryan that includes interviews with both Larkin and Chris Landreth as well as with various people who knew Larkin at the peak of his success.

Later work
As of 2002, Larkin was working with composer Laurie Gordon of the band 'Chiwawa' on a new animated film entitled Spare Change, his first auteur film since working at the NFB. Together, they founded Spare Change Productions and sought funding for the film through Gordon's production company MusiVision. They received grants from Bravo!FACT, the Canada Council for the Arts and the Conseil des arts et des lettres du Québec and SODEC but were still short of financing. MusiVision and the National Film Board of Canada went into co-production only after Larkin's death.

Spare Change, which premiered at the Festival du Nouveau Cinema on October 9, 2008, features three Chiwawa tunes for which Larkin created storyboards and animation, including Do It For Me from the 2005 album Bright. The 2009 Chiwawa album Bus Stop Chinese Buffet include tracks from Spare Change; the lyrics of Overcast Skies were penned by Larkin.

MusiVision's Gordon and Nicola Zavaglia also produced the documentary film Ryan's Renaissance for CTV Television about Ryan's final years, his return to creating art, and Spare Change. Larkin, who had panhandled outside Montreal Schwartz's deli, appeared briefly in a documentary on the famous restaurant, Chez Schwartz, directed by Garry Beitel.

In December 2006, Larkin created three five-second bumpers for MTV in Canada, a preview to Spare Change. Each frame was hand-drawn. It was the first professional work he had executed in over 20 years. Larkin said that he had given up some bad habits, including drinking, in order to better focus on his animating career.

Death
Larkin died in Saint-Hyacinthe, Quebec, on February 14, 2007, from lung cancer, which had spread to his brain.

Filmography
The Ball Resolver in Antac – animated short, Bernard Longpré 1964 – co-animator with William Pettigrew 
Syrinx – animated short, 1965 – director
Cityscape – animated short, 1966 - animator, producer, director
The Canadian Forces Hydrofoil Ship: Concept and Design – documentary short, Martin Defalco and Kenneth McCready 1967 – co-animator with Sidney Goldsmith
 Walking – animated short, 1968 – animator, producer, director
Street Musique – animated short, 1972 - animator, producer, director
Running Time – feature, Mort Ransen 1974 – co-animator with Co Hoedeman 
The Agency – feature, George Kaczender, RSL Entertainment 1981 – co-animator with Ida Eva Zielinska
Gulf Stream – documentary short, William Hansen and Bruce Mackay, 1982 – co-animator with Meilan Lam, Kenneth Horn and Sydney Goldsmith
Spare Change – animated short, 2008 – writer, animator, designer, cinematographer, co-director with Laurie Gordon

Awards

Syrinx (1965)
 18th Canadian Film Awards, Montreal: Genie Award for Best Film, Arts and Experimental, 1966
 Golden Gate International Film Festival, San Francisco: Certificate of Motion Picture Excellence, 1966
 International Film Festival at Addis Ababa, Addis Ababa, Ethiopia: First Prize, Best Short film, 1966
 Philadelphia International Festival of Short Films, Philadelphia: Award for Exceptional Merit, 1968

Cityscape (1966)
 Golden Gate International Film Festival, San Francisco: Honorable Mention, Film-as-Art, 1967

Walking (1968) 
 21st Canadian Film Awards, Toronto: Genie Award for Best Animated Film 1969
 Chicago International Film Festival, Chicago:  Gold Hugo for Best Animated Film, 1969
 American Film and Video Festival, New York: Blue Ribbon, 1969
 Adelaide International Film Festival, Adelaide: Silver Southern Cross Plaque, 1969
 Kraków Film Festival, Kraków: Award of the Science and Art Films Committee, 1969
 Golden Gate International Film Festival, San Francisco: Certificate of Merit, Short Films, 1969
 La Plata International Children's Film Festival, La Plata: Honourable Mention, 1969
 Melbourne International Film Festival, Melbourne: Silver Boomerang – Silver Boomerang, 1970
 Salerno Film Festival, Salerno: Diploma of Merit, 1970
 International Week of Cinema in Colour, Barcelona: Silver Medal, 1970
 Roshd International Film Festival, Tehran: Golden Delfan - General Release, Children and Young Adults, 1971
 San Francisco Short Film Festival, San Francisco: Certificate of Merit in Recognition of the Artistic Quality and Significance of the Work of Ryan Larkin for the film Walking, 1976
 42nd Academy Awards, Los Angeles: Nominee: Academy Award for Best Animated Short Film, 1970

Street Musique (1972)
 International Week of Animation Cinema, Barcelona: Molinillo de Oro, First Prize, Special Techniques, 1972
 Melbourne International Film Festival, Melbourne: Grand Prix – Gold Boomerang, 1973
 International Short Film Festival Oberhausen, Oberhausen: First Prize of the International Animation Film Jury, 1973
 Columbus International Film & Animation Festival, Columbus, Ohio: Chris Bronze Plaque, 1973 
 FIBA International Festival of Buenos Aires, Buenos Aires: Honorable Mention, 1974

See also
History of Canadian animation

References

External links

Ryan Larkin at the NFB (watch Street Musique and Walking for free)
 Animation World Magazine - Last Exit on St. Laurent Street
 NFB Web page for the animated short Ryan
 NFB Web page for the documentary Alter Egos
 Film Reference Library biography

1943 births
2007 deaths
Anglophone Quebec people
Artists from Montreal
Bisexual artists
Bisexual men
Canadian animators
Canadian cartoonists
Deaths from cancer in Quebec
Deaths from lung cancer
Directors of Genie and Canadian Screen Award winners for Best Animated Short
Film directors from Montreal
LGBT animators
Canadian LGBT artists
National Film Board of Canada people
People from Saint-Hyacinthe
20th-century Canadian LGBT people